The Scandal of Sophie Dawes is a 1934 historical non-fiction work by Marjorie Bowen. It is based on the life of the Sophie Dawes, Baronne de Feuchères an English adventuress who became a courtesan in Restoration France following the fall of Napoleon. It was positively reviewed in the New York Times on its 1935 American publication.

References

Bibliography
 Searle, Adrian. The Infamous Sophie Dawes: New Light on the Queen of Chantilly. Pen and Sword History, 2020.
 Vinson, James. Twentieth-Century Romance and Gothic Writers. Macmillan, 1982.

1934 non-fiction books
Works by Marjorie Bowen
Bourbon Restoration
John Lane (publisher) books